James Marshall McGhie, Lord McGhie is a Scottish lawyer who until 2014 was the Chairman of the Scottish Land Court and President of the Lands Tribunal for Scotland, and a Senator of the College of Justice.

Personal life
McGhie was educated at Perth Academy, and studied at the School of Law of the University of Edinburgh. He was admitted to the Faculty of Advocates in 1969. He married Anne Cockburn in 1968, with whom he has a son and a daughter.

Legal career
McGhie was appointed Queen's Counsel in 1983, and served as an Advocate Depute from 1983 to 1986. From 1987 to 1992, he was part-time Chairman of the Medical Appeal Tribunal, and from 1992 to 1996 was a Member of the Criminal Injuries Compensation Board. In 1996, he was appointed Chairman of the Scottish Land Court and President of the Lands Tribunal for Scotland, with the judicial title, Lord McGhie.

See also
Scottish Land Court
Lands Tribunal for Scotland
List of Senators of the College of Justice

References

Place of birth missing (living people)
1944 births
Alumni of the University of Edinburgh
Members of the Faculty of Advocates
People educated at Perth Academy
Scottish King's Counsel
20th-century King's Counsel
Chairs of the Scottish Land Court
Living people